Jordan Danger (born Jordan Hinson, June 4, 1991) is an American actress. She is best known for her role as Zoe Carter on the science fiction series Eureka.

Early life
Hinson was born in El Paso, Texas. She began acting in plays at the age of six. After moving to Los Angeles, California, Hinson appeared in numerous television commercials.

Career
Hinson made her television movie debut in 2005, starring as an aspiring professional figure skater Katelin Kingsford in the Disney Channel Original Movie Go Figure. She had to learn to ice skate for the film and was trained by Olympic choreographer and two-time Emmy winner Sarah Kawahara. She also starred in a direct-to-video film Glass House: The Good Mother opposite Angie Harmon.

Filmography

Film

Television

References

External links
 
 
 Jordan Hinson's Twitter Account
 Jordan Danger's Instagram Account

1991 births
Actresses from El Paso, Texas
American child actresses
American film actresses
American television actresses
Living people
21st-century American actresses